Tropidophorus perplexus  is a species of skink found in Indonesia and Malaysia.

References

perplexus
Reptiles of Indonesia
Reptiles described in 1921
Taxa named by Thomas Barbour